The men's decathlon event at the 2015 Asian Athletics Championships was held on June 6 and 7.

Medalists

Results

100 metres
Wind: –0.9 m/s

Long jump

Shot put

High jump

400 metres

110 metres hurdles
Wind: +1.2 m/s

Discus throw

Pole vault

Javelin throw

1500 metres

Final standings

References

Decathlon
Combined events at the Asian Athletics Championships